Gloucestershire All Golds is a rugby league team based at the University of Gloucestershire, Cheltenham, Gloucestershire.

University of Gloucestershire All Golds consists of six different teams, with the first team entering Kingstone Press Championship 1 for the 2013 season and exiting it to join the Southern League in 2017. Below the semi-professional side, there are two student teams that compete in the British Universities and Colleges Sport (BUCS) leagues; the All Golds in the Super 8 national league and the All Blues in the Wales and West Division.

There are also three junior sides that take part in the Midlands Junior League.

Men's team

History

The University of Gloucestershire rugby league club dated back to the late 1990s. In 2008, they were given a slot in the BUCS Super 8, the highest student rugby league division, which they have retained until 2017. In 2012, the All Golds' senior team defeated Super League clubs London Broncos, Widnes and Salford in a Rugby League 9s competition. The student squad also reached the semi-finals of the Super 8. The All Golds launched a junior academy in April consisting of three sides competing in the Midlands Junior League.

In March 2013, the University of Gloucestershire All Golds entered the semi-professional ranks for the first time featuring in the Kingstone Press Championship 1 league alongside fellow newcomers Hemel Stags and Oxford. Brad Hepi was appointed head coach of the Gloucestershire All-Golds for the 2013 season. He coached the side in their first season of the Kingstone Press Championship 1 league where they reached bottom place. In the 2014 Kingston Press Championship 1 season he saw the side into the first seven-game before stepping down from the position, stating he had taken the side as far as he could. The club's community manager Dan Garbutt took charge of All Golds for one game against Hemel Stags before Steve McCormack was appointed for the remainder of the 2014 season.

On 3 November 2014, former Halifax assistant coach Lee Greenwood was appointed the head coach after Steve McCormack had left for 'personal reasons' at the end of the 2014 season.

At the end of the 2017 season it was announced that the All Golds would merge with Oxford to form a club in Bristol for 2019. However, when this failed to occur, the club continued to operate in the Southern Rugby league.

Seasons summary

Women's team
After a number of years of dormancy, the Golden Ferns name was resurrected in 2021 for a new women's rugby league team, set to compete in the inaugural season of the RFL Women's Super League South competition, starting in June 2021.

Seasons

References

External links

 Gloucestershire All-Golds forum on rlfans.com

 
University and college rugby league clubs
English rugby league teams